Reinhard Wilhelm (born June 5, 1946) is a German computer scientist.

Life and work 
He studied math, physics and mathematical logic at University of Münster and computer science at Technical University Munich and Stanford University. He finished his PhD at TU Munich in 1977. In 1978, he obtained a professorship at Saarland University, where he led the chair for programming languages and compiler construction until his retirement in 2014. In addition, Wilhelm has held the post of scientific director of the Leibniz Center for Informatics at Schloss Dagstuhl from its inception in 1990 until 2014. Today he is a professor emeritus at Saarland University.

Wilhelm is one of the co-founders of the European Symposium on Programming (ESOP) and the European Joint Conferences on Theory and Practice of Software (ETAPS). The European Association for Programming Languages (EAPLS) goes back to his idea to found an organization for advancing research on programming languages and programming systems. In 1998, he founded AbsInt, a research spin-off that offers software-quality assurance tools based on abstract interpretation, among them tools for the verification of real-time requirements, used for example for certification of the time-critical embedded systems inside the Airbus A380.

Wilhelm's research focuses on programming languages, compiler construction, static program analysis and embedded real time systems, but also includes animation and visualization of algorithms and data structures. Wilhelm discovered connections between code selection and the theory of regular tree automata, which is relevant for code generation using tree automata. He is one of the co-developers of the MUG1, MUG2 and OPTRAN compiler generators, which are based on attribute grammars. Together with Ulrich Möncke, he proposed grammar flow analysis as a generalization of interprocedural data flow analysis. He invented a popular shape analysis based on three-valued logic together with Mooly Sagiv and Tom Reps.

Wilhelm is co-author of the book Compiler Construction, which teaches compilers not only for imperative languages, but for object-oriented, functional and logical ones as well and stresses theoretical foundation. It is available in German and French, too.

Wilhelm became a fellow of the ACM in 2000 for his research on compiler construction and program analysis and his work as a scientific director of the LZI. The TU Darmstadt and the  awarded him with the Alwin-Walther medal in  2006. In 2007 the French Ministry of Education and Research awarded him with the Gay-Lussac-Humboldt prize for his contributions to science and his achievements in German–French cooperation in research and education. He became a member of the European academy of sciences (Academia Europaea) in 2008. October of the same year he was awarded an honorary doctorate of the RWTH Aachen. In December, he obtained an honorary degree of Tartu University. In September 2009, he was awarded the Konrad Zuse Medal for his achievements in research and education with respect to compiler construction, real time analysis of programs and his service as scientific director of the LZI/Schloss Dagstuhl. In 2010 he was awarded the Cross of the Order of Merit of the Federal Republic of Germany and the ACM Distinguished Service Award. In 2013 he was accepted into the German National Academy Leopoldina. He received the Test-of-Time award at the international conference ESWEEK 2019 for the long term impact of his research on execution time bounds. In 2020, the IEEE Technical Committee on Real Time Systems awarded him their Outstanding Technical Achievement and Leadership Award. In 2021, he received the Test-of-Time Award of the IEEE Technical Committee on Real-Time Systems (TCRTS) for the article "The influence of processor architecture on the design and the results of WCET tools".

List of books 
 Jacques Loeckx, Kurt Mehlhorn, Reinhard Wilhelm: Foundations of Programming Languages 1989
 Reinhard Wilhelm: Informatics - 10 Years Back. 10 Years Ahead. Springer 2001
 Reinhard Wilhelm, Helmut Seidl: Compiler Design: Virtual Machines, Springer 2011
 Helmut Seidl, Reinhard Wilhelm, Sebastian Hack: Compiler Design: Analysis and Transformation, Springer 2011
 Helmut Seidl, Reinhard Wilhelm, Sebastian Hack: Compiler Design: Syntactic and Semantic Analysis, Springer 2011
 Reinhard Wilhelm: Einsichten eines Informatikers von geringem Verstande – Glossen aus dem Informatik Spektrum. Springer Fachmedien, Wiesbaden 2020, .
 Reinhard Wilhelm: Von Autopiloten, Taliban und dem Friedrichstadtpalast: Neue Einsichten eines Informatikers von geringem Verstande. Independently published 2022, .

Literature 
 Thomas Reps, Mooly Sagiv, Jörg Bauer: An Appreciation of the Work of Reinhard Wilhelm. Program Analysis and Compilation, Theory and Practice (Springer, 2007), Lecture Notes in Computer Science Volume 4444.

References

External links 
 Reinhard Wilhelm's home page
 Summer school talk by Reinhard Wilhelm on real-time analysis
 
 Entry at the Mathematics Genealogy Project

Members of Academia Europaea
People from Olpe (district)
German computer scientists
Technical University of Munich alumni
Academic staff of Saarland University
Recipients of the Cross of the Order of Merit of the Federal Republic of Germany
Fellows of the Association for Computing Machinery
1946 births
Living people